Robert H. Taylor (died, aged 76, on 5 May 1985) was a bibliophile who was president of the Grolier Club, the Keats-Shelley Association of America and the Bibliographical Society of America. He donated his collection of 7,000 books, manuscripts and drawings  to Princeton University in 1971. He had graduated from Princeton in 1930.

Grandson of businessman and politician John Emory Andrus, Taylor served as director of the Surdna Foundation, a philanthropy established by Andrus in 1917.

Collecting
Taylor's collection was noted for its works by Anthony Trollope and Richard Brinsley Sheridan. One important item owned by Taylor was the original manuscript for Sheridan's The School for Scandal which he acquired via Barton Currie. The collection also includes a number of original manuscripts of John Locke. One of his notable works was translating the Burmese writer, Thein Pe Myint's Wartime Traveller into English.

References

External links
Robert H. Taylor Collection of English and American Literature 1280-1958 Finding Aid

American book and manuscript collectors
Year of birth missing
People from Gloucester, Massachusetts
Princeton University alumni
1900s births
1985 deaths
20th-century American writers
20th-century American male writers